The 1967 USAC Championship Car season consisted of 21 races, beginning in Avondale, Arizona on April 9 and concluding in Riverside, California on November 26. This season saw three new road courses added to the schedule in addition to the Hoosier Grand Prix at IRP: Mosport in Canada; Circuit Mont-Tremblant also in Canada; and the season finale at Riverside International Raceway in southern California in the United States. The USAC National Champion and Indianapolis 500 winner was A. J. Foyt.

Schedule and results

 Race was red flagged on May 30th lap 19 due to rain. The race was run to completion the next day (May 31st).
 No pole is awarded for the Pikes Peak Hill Climb, in this schedule on the pole is the driver who started first. No lap led was awarded for the Pikes Peak Hill Climb, however, a lap was awarded to the drivers that completed the climb.
 Run in two heats of 98 miles (158 kilometers) each.
 Run in two heats of 100 miles (161 kilometers) each.

Final points standings

Note: Ronnie Bucknum, George Follmer, Dan Gurney, Jimmy Clark, Lothar Motschenbacher, Jochen Rindt, Denis Hulme, Jackie Stewart, Graham Hill, John Surtees, Cale Yarborough, LeeRoy Yarbrough, Peter Revson and Jerry Titus are not eligible for points.

References
 
 
 http://media.indycar.com/pdf/2011/IICS_2011_Historical_Record_Book_INT6.pdf  (p. 250-255)

See also
 1967 Indianapolis 500

USAC Championship Car season
USAC Championship Car
1967 in American motorsport